George Yemens Bliss (March 12, 1864 – July 10, 1924) was an American cleric who was the coadjutor bishop of the Episcopal Diocese of Vermont, serving from 1915 until his death in 1924.

Early life and education
Bliss was born on March 12, 1864, in Shelburne, Vermont, the son of George Bliss and Mary Adelaide Stevens. He studied at the University of Vermont and graduated with a Bachelor of Arts in 1889. The same university awarded him a Doctor of Divinity in 1904. He also graduated with a Bachelor of Sacred Theology from the General Theological Seminary in 1892. He married on November 15, 1893, to Katherine Lucinda Shattuck, and together had three children.

Ordained Ministry
Bliss was ordained deacon on June 12, 1892, by Bishop William Henry Augustus Bissell of Vermont in St Paul's Church. He was then ordained priest in 1893 by Bishop Henry A. Neely of Maine. After ordination to the diaconate, he became curate at St Paul's Church in Burlington, Vermont and in 1899 became rector of the same church. He kept the post till 1915.

Bishop
On January 20, 1915, Bliss was elected Coadjutor Bishop of Vermont. He was consecrated on April 21, 1915, at St Paul's Church in Burlington, Vermont, by the Bishop of Vermont Arthur C. A. Hall. He died as a coadjutor on July 10, 1924.

References 

American Church Almanac and Year Book 1920, p. 355.

External links 
Portrait

1864 births
1924 deaths
People from Shelburne, Vermont
University of Vermont alumni
General Theological Seminary alumni
Episcopal bishops of Vermont